This is a list of species in  the agaric genus Hebeloma. A 2008 estimate placed about 150 in the genus. , Index Fungorum accepts 321 species in Hebeloma:. A major revision of the European species was undertaken in Hebeloma in the Fungi Europaei series, published in March 2016. It concluded that there were 84 species of Hebeloma in Europe. As of November 2022, hebeloma.org  lists over 500 names used throughout history, of which 135 are said to be current, valid (non-synonymous) names.



Species

A

Hebeloma aestivale Vesterh.
Hebeloma alboerumpens
Hebeloma alpinum (J.Favre) Bruchet
Hebeloma aminophilum R.N.Hilton & O.K.Mill.
Hebeloma ammophilum Bohus (1978)
Hebeloma anthracophilum Maire
Hebeloma arenosum Burds., Macfall & M.A.Albers 1986
Hebeloma atrobrunneum Vesterh. 1989 – Great Britain
Hebeloma aurantiellum A.H.Sm., V.S.Evenson & Mitchel 1983
Hebeloma australe Murrill 1945
Hebeloma austroamericanum (Speg.) Sacc. 1887

B
Hebeloma bakeri Earle 1902
Hebeloma barrowsii  A.H.Sm., V.S.Evenson & Mitchel 1983
Hebeloma bicoloratum  A.H.Sm., V.S.Evenson & Mitchel 1983
Hebeloma birrus (Fr.) Sacc. 1887 – United Kingdom
Hebeloma boulderense A.H.Sm., V.S.Evenson & Mitchel 1983
Hebeloma bruchetii Bon 1986 – United Kingdom
Hebeloma brunneifolium Hesler 1977
Hebeloma brunneodiscum A.H.Sm., V.S.Evenson & Mitchel 1983
Hebeloma brunneomaculatum A.H.Sm., V.S.Evenson & Mitchel 1983
Hebeloma bryogenes Vesterh. 1993
Hebeloma bryophilum Murrill 1917
Hebeloma bulbaceum Herp. 1912
Hebeloma bulbiferum Maire 1937
Hebeloma busporus E.H.L.Krause 1928

C

Hebeloma caespitosum Velen. 1920
Hebeloma californicum Murrill 1917
Hebeloma calyptrosporum Bruchet 1970 – United Kingdom
Hebeloma candidipes Bruchet 1970
Hebeloma caulocystidiosum Hesler 1977
Hebeloma cavipes Huijsman 196 – Great Britain
Hebeloma chapmaniae A.H.Sm., V.S.Evenson & Mitchel 1983
Hebeloma chlorophyllum Speg. 1926
Hebeloma cinereostipes A.H.Sm., V.S.Evenson & Mitchel 1983
Hebeloma cinereum Velen. 1920
Hebeloma circinans (Quél.) Sacc. 1891 – Great Britain
Hebeloma cistophilum Maire 1928
Hebeloma clavulipes Romagn. 1965
Hebeloma coarctatum (Cooke & Massee) Pegler 1965 – Victoria
Hebeloma collariatum Bruchet 1970
Hebeloma colossus Huijsman 1961 – Great Britain
Hebeloma colvini (Peck) Sacc. 1887
Hebeloma commune (Peck) Murrill 1917
Hebeloma coniferarum A.H.Sm., V.S.Evenson & Mitchel 1983
Hebeloma coprophilum Rick 1907
Hebeloma corrugatum A.H.Sm., V.S.Evenson & Mitchel 1983
Hebeloma cortinarioides E.H.L.Krause 1928
Hebeloma crassipes Rick 1961
Hebeloma cremeopallidum (Esteve-Rav. & Heykoop) Esteve-Rav. & Heykoop 1997
Hebeloma cremeum Murrill 1917
 Hebeloma crustuliniforme (Bull.) Quél. 1872
Hebeloma cylindrosporum Romagn. 1965

D
Hebeloma discomorbidum (Peck) Peck 1910
Hebeloma dissiliens A.H.Sm., V.S.Evenson & Mitchel 1983
Hebeloma domardianum (Maire) Beker, U.Eberh. & Vesterh. 2005
Hebeloma dryophilum Murrill 1917
Hebeloma dunense L.Corb. & R.Heim 1929 – Great Britain
Hebeloma duracinoides Bidaud & Fillion 1991

E
Hebeloma earlei Murrill 1917
Hebeloma eburneum Malençon 1970
Hebeloma ellipsoideosporium Hesler 1977
Hebeloma erumpens Contu 1993
Hebeloma evensoniae A.H.Sm. & Mitchel 1983
Hebeloma excedens (Peck) Sacc. 1887
Hebeloma exiguifolium Murrill 1917

F
Hebeloma farinaceum Murrill 1917
Hebeloma favrei Romagn. & Quadr. 1985
Hebeloma felipponei  Speg. 1926
Hebeloma felleum A.H.Sm., V.S.Evenson & Mitchel 1983
Hebeloma fimicola  S.Imai 1938
Hebeloma flaccidum  A.H.Sm., V.S.Evenson & Mitchel 1983
Hebeloma flavescens  Rick 1930
Hebeloma flexuosipes Peck 1911
Hebeloma floridanum Murrill 1940
Hebeloma fragilipes Romagn. 1965 – Great Britain
Hebeloma fragilius (Peck) Sacc. 1887
Hebeloma fragrans A.H.Sm., V.S.Evenson & Mitchel 1983
Hebeloma fragrantissimum Velen. 1920
Hebeloma frenchii McAlpine 1899
Hebeloma funariophyllum M.M.Moser 1970
Hebeloma fuscostipes A.H.Sm., V.S.Evenson & Mitchel 1983
Hebeloma fusisporum Gröger & Zschiesch. 1981 – Great Britain

G
Hebeloma gigaspermum Gröger & Zschiesch. 1981 – Europe
Hebeloma glabrescens A.H.Sm., V.S.Evenson & Mitchel 1983
Hebeloma gomezii Singer 1983
Hebeloma gregarium Peck 1897
Hebeloma griseocanescens A.H.Sm., V.S.Evenson & Mitchel 1983
Hebeloma griseocanum A.H.Sm., V.S.Evenson & Mitchel 1983
Hebeloma griseopruinatum
Hebeloma griseovelatum A.H.Sm., V.S.Evenson & Mitchel 1983
Hebeloma griseum McAlpine 1895 – Victoria

H

Hebeloma harperi Murrill 1917
Hebeloma helodes J.Favre 1948 – Great Britain
Hebeloma helvolescens S.Imai 1938
Hebeloma hemisphaericum Herp. 1912
Hebeloma herrmanniae Gröger 1985
Hebeloma hesleri A.H.Sm., V.S.Evenson & Mitchel 1983
Hebeloma hetieri Boud. 1917 – Europe
Hebeloma hiemale Bres. 1892 – Great Britain
Hebeloma humile Rick 1961
Hebeloma humosum S.Imai 1938
Hebeloma hydrocybeoides A.H.Sm., V.S.Evenson & Mitchel 1983

I
Hebeloma idahoense A.H.Sm., V.S.Evenson & Mitchel 1983
Hebeloma igneum Rick 1938
Hebeloma immutabile A.H.Sm., V.S.Evenson & Mitchel 1983
Hebeloma incarnatulum A.H.Sm. 1984
Hebeloma indecisum  A.H.Sm., V.S.Evenson & Mitchel 1983
Hebeloma indicum (K.A.Thomas, Peintner, M.M.Moser & Manim.) B.J.Rees 2013
Hebeloma ingratum Bruchet 1970
Hebeloma insigne A.H.Sm., V.S.Evenson & Mitchel 1983

J
Hebeloma juneauense A.H.Sm., V.S.Evenson & Mitchel 1983

K
Hebeloma kammala Grgur. 1997
Hebeloma kanouseae A.H. Sm., V.S. Evenson & Mitchel 1983
Hebeloma kauffmanii A.H. Sm., V.S. Evenson & Mitchel 1983
Hebeloma kelloggense A.H. Sm., V.S. Evenson & Mitchel 1983
Hebeloma kemptoniae A.H. Sm., V.S. Evenson & Mitchel 1983
Hebeloma khogianum Bresinsky 2001
Hebeloma kirtonii (Kalchbr.) McAlpine 1895
Hebeloma kuehneri Bruchet 1970

L

Hebeloma lactariolens (Clémençon & Hongo) B.J. Rees 2013
Hebeloma laetitiae Quadr. 1993 - Italy
Hebeloma lamelliconfertum  Cleland 1934 – South Australia
Hebeloma laterinum (Batsch) Vesterh. 2005 – United Kingdom
Hebeloma lateritium Murrill 1917
Hebeloma latisporum A.H.Sm., V.S.Evenson & Mitchel 1983
Hebeloma leucosarx  P.D.Orton 1960 – United Kingdom
Hebeloma levyanum Murrill 1946
Hebeloma lignicola Rick 1938
Hebeloma limacinum A.H.Sm., V.S.Evenson & Mitchel 1983
Hebeloma litoreum Quadr. 1993 – Italy
Hebeloma littenii A.H.Sm., V.S.Evenson & Mitchel 1983
Hebeloma longisporum Murrill 1945
Hebeloma louiseae Beker, Vesterh. & U.Eberh 2016
Hebeloma lubriciceps  (Kauffman & A.H. Sm.) Hesler & A.H.Sm. 1984
Hebeloma luchuense  Fukiharu & Hongo 1995
Hebeloma lucidum Murrill 1946
Hebeloma lundqvistii Vesterh. 1993
Hebeloma luteobrunneum A.H.Sm., V.S.Evenson & Mitchel 1983
Hebeloma lutescentipes  A.H.Sm., V.S.Evenson & Mitchel 1983
Hebeloma luteum Murrill 1917

M

Hebeloma mackinawense Hesler & A.H.Sm. 1984
Hebeloma macrosporum Velen. 1920
Hebeloma majale  Velen. 1920
Hebeloma malenconii Bellù & Lanzoni 1988
Hebeloma mammillatum Velen. 1939
Hebeloma mammosum  Rick 1930
Hebeloma marginatulum  (J.Favre) Bruchet 1970
Hebeloma maritinum A.H.Sm., V.S.Evenson & Mitchel 1983
Hebeloma mediorufum  Soop 2001
Hebeloma mediterraneum (A.Gennari) Contu 2008 – Italy
Hebeloma megacarpum A.H.Sm. ex Grilli 2005
Hebeloma mesophaeum  (Pers.) Quél. 1872 – Europe; Australia
Hebeloma microsporum  (Alessio & Nonis) Contu 2008
Hebeloma minus  Bruchet 1970
Hebeloma miserum Rick 1930
Hebeloma montanum Cleland & Cheel 1918
Hebeloma moseri Singer 1969

N
Hebeloma nanum Velen. 1939
Hebeloma naucorioides  Rick 1938
Hebeloma naufragum (Speg.) Sacc. 1891
Hebeloma naviculosporum Heykoop, G.Moreno & Esteve-Rav. 1992
Hebeloma neurophyllum  G.F.Atk. 1909
Hebeloma nigellum Bruchet 1970 – United Kingdom
Hebeloma nigricans Velen. 1920
Hebeloma nigromaculatum A.H.Sm., V.S.Evenson & Mitchel 1983
Hebeloma nitidum Hesler 1977

O
Hebeloma obscurum A.H.Sm., V.S.Evenson & Mitchel 1983
Hebeloma occidentale  A.H.Sm., V.S.Evenson & Mitchel 1983
Hebeloma ochraceum W.F. Chiu 1973
Hebeloma ochroalbidum  Bohus 1972 – Channel Islands
Hebeloma octavii  Velen. 1939
Hebeloma oculatum Bruchet 1970 – United Kingdom
Hebeloma odoratum Velen. 1920
Hebeloma ollaliense  A.H.Sm., V.S.Evenson & Mitchel 1983
Hebeloma olympianum  A.H.Sm., V.S.Evenson & Mitchel 1983
Hebeloma oregonense A.H.Sm., V.S.Evenson & Mitchel 1983

P

Hebeloma pallescens A.H.Sm., V.S.Evenson & Mitchel 1983
Hebeloma pallidifolium Murrill 1945
Hebeloma pallidoargillaceum  A.H.Sm., V.S.Evenson & Mitchel 1983
Hebeloma pallidoluctuosum Gröger & Zschiesch. 1984 – United Kingdom
Hebeloma pallidomarginatum (Peck) Sacc. 1887 – New York
Hebeloma paludicola Murrill 1917
Hebeloma pamphiliense Cittadini, Lezzi & Contu 2008
Hebeloma parvicystidiatum
Hebeloma parcivelum A.H.Sm., V.S.Evenson & Mitchel 1983
Hebeloma parvifructum  (Peck) Sacc. 1887
Hebeloma pascuense Peck 1901
Hebeloma peckii  House 1915
Hebeloma perangustisporium Hesler 1977
Hebeloma perfarinaceum A.H.Sm., V.S.Evenson & Mitchel 1983
Hebeloma perigoense A.H.Sm., V.S.Evenson & Mitchel 1983
Hebeloma perpallidum  M.M. Moser 1970
Hebeloma perplexum A.H.Sm., V.S. Evenson & Mitchel 1983
Hebeloma petrakii  (Hruby) Singer 1951
Hebeloma piceicola A.H.Sm., V.S.Evenson & Mitchel 1983
Hebeloma pinetorum A.H.Sm., V.S.Evenson & Mitchel 1983
Hebeloma pitkinense A.H.Sm., V.S.Evenson & Mitchel 1983
Hebeloma platense  Speg. 1898
Hebeloma plesiocistum Beker, U.Eberh. & Vila 2009
Hebeloma polare Vesterh. 1989
Hebeloma politum Hesler 1977
Hebeloma populinum Romagn. 1965
Hebeloma porphyrosporum Maire 1931 – Italy
Hebeloma praecaespitosum A.H.Sm., V.S.Evenson & Mitchel 1983
Hebeloma praefarinaceum Murrill 1938
Hebeloma praefelleum Murrill 1945
Hebeloma praelatifolium A.H.Sm., V.S.Evenson & Mitchel 1983
Hebeloma praeolidum  A.H.Sm., V.S.Evenson & Mitchel 1983
Hebeloma praeviscidum  Murrill 1946
Hebeloma proletaria Velen. 1920
Hebeloma proximum A.H.Sm., V.S. Evenson & Mitchel 1983
Hebeloma psammicola Bohus 1978
Hebeloma psammophilum Bon 1986 – United Kingdom
Hebeloma pseudoamarescens (Kühner & Romagn.) P.Collin 1988 – United Kingdom
Hebeloma pseudofastabile A.H.Sm., V.S.Evenson & Mitchel 1983
Hebeloma pseudomesophaeum A.H.Sm., V.S.Evenson & Mitchel 1983
Hebeloma pseudostrophosum A.H.Sm., V.S.Evenson & Mitchel 1983
Hebeloma pudica Hruby 1930
Hebeloma pumiloides A.H.Sm., V.S.Evenson & Mitchel 1983
Hebeloma punctatiforme Hruby 1930
Hebeloma pungens A.H.Sm., V.S.Evenson & Mitchel 1983
Hebeloma pusillum J.E.Lange 1940 – United Kingdom
Hebeloma pyrophilum G.Moreno & M.M.Moser 1984

Q
Hebeloma quercetorum Quadr. 1993 – Italy

R

Hebeloma radicosoides Sagara, Hongo & Y.Murak 2000
 Hebeloma radicosum (Bull.) Ricken 1911 – Europe
Hebeloma remyi Bruchet 1970
Hebeloma repandum (Schumach.) Konrad & Maubl. 1937
Hebeloma riparium A.H.Sm., V.S.Evenson & Mitchel 1983
Hebeloma rivulosum Hesler 1977
Hebeloma rubrofuscum Velen. 1920

S

Hebeloma sacchariolens Quél. 1880 – United Kingdom
Hebeloma salmonense A.H.Sm., V.S.Evenson & Mitchel 1983
Hebeloma sanjuanense A.H.Sm., V.S.Evenson & Mitchel 1983
Hebeloma sarcophyllum (Peck) Sacc. 1887
Hebeloma sericipes Earle 1902
Hebeloma serratum (Cleland) E. Horak 1980
Hebeloma simile Kauffman 1918
 Hebeloma sinapizans (Paulet) Gillet 1876 – Europe
Hebeloma sinuosum (Fr.) Quél. 1873
Hebeloma smithii Quadr. 1987 – United Kingdom
Hebeloma sociale Peck 1904
Hebeloma solheimii A.H.Sm., V.S.Evenson & Mitchel 1983
Hebeloma sordescens Vesterh. 1989 – United Kingdom
Hebeloma sordidum Maire 1914
Hebeloma spoliatum (Fr.) Gillet 1876 – United Kingdom
Hebeloma sporadicum A.H.Sm. 1938 – Michigan
Hebeloma squamulosum Velen. 1920
Hebeloma stanleyense A.H.Sm., V.S.Evenson & Mitchel 1983
Hebeloma stenocystis J.Favre 1960
Hebeloma sterlingii (Peck) Murrill 1917
Hebeloma suaveolens  Velen. 1920
Hebeloma subannulatum  A.H.Sm., V.S.Evenson & Mitchel 1983
Hebeloma subargillaceum A.H.Sm., V.S.Evenson & Mitchel 1983
Hebeloma subaustrale Murrill 1946
Hebeloma subboreale A.H.Sm., V.S.Evenson & Mitchel 1983
Hebeloma subcaespitosum Bon 1978
Hebeloma subcapitatum A.H.Sm., V.S.Evenson & Mitchel 1983
Hebeloma subconcolor Bruchet 1970
Hebeloma subfastibile Murrill 1945
Hebeloma subfastigiatum A.H.Sm., V.S.Evenson & Mitchel 1983
Hebeloma subhepaticum A.H.Sm., V.S.Evenson & Mitchel 1983
Hebeloma subincarnatum Murrill 1912
Hebeloma sublamellatum A.H.Sm., V.S.Evenson & Mitchel 1983
Hebeloma submelinoides (Kühner) Kühner 1980 – United Kingdom
Hebeloma subplatense Rick 1938
Hebeloma subrimosum A.H.Sm., V.S.Evenson & Mitchel 1983
Hebeloma subrubescens  A.H.Sm., V.S.Evenson & Mitchel 1983
Hebeloma substrophosum A.H.Sm., V.S.Evenson & Mitchel 1983
Hebeloma subumbrinum A.H.Sm., V.S.Evenson & Mitchel 1983
Hebeloma subvatricosoides Murrill 1946
Hebeloma subviolaceum A.H.Sm., V.S.Evenson & Mitchel 1983
Hebeloma syrjense P.Karst. 1879

T
Hebeloma tenuifolium Romagn. 1985
Hebeloma theobrominum Quadr. 1987 – United Kingdom
Hebeloma tomoeae S.Imai 1938
Hebeloma trachysporum Petch 1925
Hebeloma trinidadense A.H.Sm., V.S.Evenson & Mitchel 1983

U
Hebeloma urbanicola  A.H.Sm., V.S.Evenson & Mitchel 1983
Hebeloma utahense A.H.Sm., V.S.Evenson & Mitchel 1983

V

Hebeloma vaccinum Romagn. 1965 – Europe
Hebeloma vatricosoides Murrill 1917
Hebeloma vatricosum (Fr.) Murrill 1917
Hebeloma vejlense Vesterh. 2005
Hebeloma velatum (Peck) Peck 1910
Hebeloma vernale Velen. 1920
Hebeloma versipelle (Fr.) Gillet 1876
Hebeloma vesterholtii H.J.Beker & U.Eberh. (2010)
Hebeloma victoriae (Cooke & Massee) Pegler 1965 – Victoria
Hebeloma victoriense A.A.Holland & Pegler 1983 – Victoria
Hebeloma vinaceogriseum A.H.Sm., V.S.Evenson & Mitchel 1983
Hebeloma vinaceoumbrinum A.H.Sm., V.S.Evenson & Mitchel 1983
 Hebeloma vinosophyllum Hongo (1965)
Hebeloma virgatum  Velen. 1920

W
Hebeloma weberi Murrill 1945
Hebeloma wells-kemptoniae A.H.Sm., V.S.Evenson & Mitchel 1983
Hebeloma wellsiae A.H.Sm., V.S.Evenson & Mitchel 1983
Hebeloma westraliense Bougher, Tommerup & Malajczuk 1991 – Australia

X
Hebeloma xerophilum Rudn.-Jez. 1967

References

Hebeloma